The Liber ad honorem Augusti sive de rebus Siculis ("Book in honour of the Emperor, or on Sicilian affairs"; also called Carmen de motibus Siculis, "Poem on the Sicilian revolt") is an illustrated narrative epic in Latin elegiac couplets, written in Palermo in 1196 by Peter of Eboli (in Latin, Petrus de Ebulo). The presentation copy, ordered by chancellor Conrad of Querfurt, is now MS. 120 II of the Berne Municipal Library.

It tells the story of Tancred of Lecce's attempt to take control of Sicily, an attempt thwarted by the successful military campaign of Henry VI, Holy Roman Emperor. Composed in honour of Henry VI and intended for presentation to him, the poem, distributed into three books, the last one being an encomium of Henry VI, and 52 continuously numbered particulae, is written in a mannered and sophisticated style. It is often mocking and extremely biased (see for example part. 4; 7-9; 25f. and the illustrations), but, once allowance has been made for this, is a useful and detailed historical source. It contains much information about Constance of Sicily, the wife of Henry VI (part. 20ff.), and the birth of her son Frederick II, Holy Roman Emperor (part. 43).

At every page opening a column of Latin text is faced by a full page illustration with brief captions. This beautiful volume gives a rich picture of 12th century life in Italy and Sicily; it may be compared with the 11th century Bayeux Tapestry. The fierce caricatures of Tancred, who is depicted as almost ape-like in stature and features, match the propagandistic bias of the text.

References

External links 
 Latin text of the Liber ad honorem Augusti

Bibliography 
 Theo Kölzer, Marlis Stähli, Petrus de Ebulo: Liber ad honorem Augusti sive de rebus Siculis, text revised, translated and annotated by Gereon-Becht-Jördens, Jan Thorbecke Verlag, 1994  [Complete facsimile with German translation and commentary]
 Petrus de Ebulo, Book in Honor of Augustus (Liber ad honorem Augusti), trans. Gwenyth Hood, Medieval & Renaissance Texts & Studies v.398 (Tempe, AZ: Arizona Center for Medieval and Renaissance Studies, 2012), 560pp.  [English translation]

Epic poems in Latin
12th-century Latin books
12th-century history books
1196 books
12th-century illuminated manuscripts
Frederick II, Holy Roman Emperor
Henry VI, Holy Roman Emperor